USS West Corum (ID-3982) was a cargo ship for the United States Navy in 1919. The ship was built as SS West Corum and reverted to that name at the end of her Navy service. During World War II, the ship was United States Army transport ship USAT West Corum, later renamed to Will H. Point (sometimes listed as William H. Point).

SS West Corum was a steam-powered ship built for the United States Shipping Board (USSB) as part of the West boats, a series of steel-hulled cargo ships built on the West Coast of the United States for the World War I war effort. She was the 13th ship built by Columbia River Shipbuilding Company in Portland, Oregon. She was commissioned into the Naval Overseas Transportation Service (NOTS) of the United States Navy in January 1919. After one overseas trips for the Navy, she was decommissioned in May 1919 and returned to the USSB.

Early in her civilian career, she sailed between New York City and Bordeaux, but later shifted to sailing to Antwerp. For most of the 1920s, West Corum sailed to Argentine ports. By 1939, West Corum had been laid up in New Orleans. In 1940, she was reconditioned, transferred to the United States Army, and renamed USAT Will H. Point. During World War II, the ship sailed primarily in the Pacific Ocean, calling at ports in Australia, Alaska, and the U.S. West Coast. Will H. Point was laid up in the reserve fleet in Astoria, Oregon, in January 1947 and sold for scrapping in July of that same year.

U.S. Navy career 
Upon completion of West Corum in February 1919, three months after the end of fighting in World War I, she was handed over to the United States Navy for use in the NOTS on 10 February. She was commissioned as USS West Corum (ID-3982) the same day.

West Corum took on a load of wheat flour and sailed on 24 February for the East Coast. After transiting the Panama Canal, she arrived at Norfolk, Virginia, on 19 March. Sailing soon after, she headed for Constantinople, Turkey, where she delivered her cargo on 18 April. On 1 May, West Corum set out from Constantinople for the United States via Gibraltar. She arrived in Norfolk on 6 June and was decommissioned three days later and returned to the USSB.

Civilian career 
Many details of West Corums post-Navy career are unknown, but mentions in shipping reports in contemporary newspapers offer hints at her activities. The New York Times reports on West Corums impending arrival from Bordeaux in October 1919, and from Antwerp in May and August 1920. By November 1920, West Corum had apparently begun sailing to Argentine ports.

Most newspaper mentions of West Corum do not report what sorts of cargo she carried, but a January 1922 Associated Press story in The Christian Science Monitor reveals her cargo for one voyage from Argentina. In what the news item said was the first full load of cargo leaving Buenos Aires in nearly a year, West Corum carried 107,000 animal hides, estimated to be enough for 1,000,000 pairs of shoes, along with consignments of wool and linseed. The ship continued calling at Buenos Aires and Santa Fe, Argentina, as late as 1927, but by 1939, West Corum had been laid up in a reserve fleet at New Orleans.

World War II 

In June 1940, the United States Maritime Commission (USMC) opened bidding for the reconditioning of ten laid up cargo ships, which included West Corum. According to the Los Angeles Times, the USMC, a successor to the USSB, was forced to act because of a "critical shortage" of U.S. Navy auxiliary ships. Though there is no specific information available regarding West Corum, the cost of reconditioning West Honaker, another of the laid up West boats, was $77,777. In November, West Corum was one of different group of ten ships taken up by the United States Army for defense service.

The ship's movements under Army control are largely unknown, but in January 1941, The New York Times reported that USAT West Corum had arrived in New York from Puerto Rico. Between February and March 1941, the ship was renamed USAT Will H. Point (though some sources indicate William H. Point instead) in honor of a former officer in the Quartermaster Corps.

Some other destinations for Will H. Point during her Army service are known. On 15 June 1941, the ship became the first ship to dock at the newly completed port facilities at Anchorage, Alaska. From September 1943 to January 1944, Will H. Point sailed between ports in Australia and New Guinea. Sailing mostly in convoys, Will H. Point visited Gladstone, Brisbane, Caloundra, Townsville, and Milne Bay.

After the war's end, Will H. Point is listed in the Chicago Daily Tribune as returning 11 U.S. Army personnel from Pearl Harbor to San Francisco in July 1946. The following January, Will H. Point entered the National Defense Reserve Fleet (NDRF) at Astoria, Oregon, and was withdrawn for scrapping in August.

Notes

References

Bibliography 

 
 
 

Design 1013 ships of the United States Navy
Ships built in Portland, Oregon
1919 ships
Transport ships of the United States Army
World War II auxiliary ships of the United States